Danvers is a town in Essex County, Massachusetts, United States, located on the Danvers River near the northeastern coast of Massachusetts. The suburb is a fairly short ride from Boston and is also in close proximity to the renowned beaches of Gloucester and Revere. Originally known as Salem Village, the town is most widely known for its association with the 1692 Salem witch trials. It was also the site of Danvers State Hospital, one of the state's 19th-century psychiatric hospitals. Danvers is a local center of commerce, hosting many car dealerships and the Liberty Tree Mall. As of the 2020 United States Census, the town's population was 28,087.

History

Pre-Columbian era
The area was long settled by indigenous cultures of Native Americans. In the historic period, the Massachusett, a tribe of the Pequot language family, dominated the area.

The land that is now Danvers was once owned by the Naumkeag branch of the Massachusett tribe.

Salem Village
Around 1630, English colonists improved an existing Naumkeag trail as the Old Spanish Road, creating a connection to the main cities of Salem and Boston. Danvers was permanently settled in 1636 as Salem Village, and eventually petitioned the Crown for a charter as a town. According to legend, the King, rather than signing the charter, returned it with the message "The King Unwilling." On June 9, 1757, the town was incorporated regardless, and the King's rebuff was included on the town's seal. In 1752, the town was named for settler Danvers Osborn.

The historical event for which Danvers is best-known is the Salem witch trials of 1692. Resident Rebecca Nurse was convicted in a trial for witchcraft. The Rebecca Nurse Homestead is still standing in Danvers, and can be visited as a historical landmark.

18th century
From the Battle of Lexington onward, Danvers residents have participated in the armed forces. Noteworthy Revolutionary figures who stayed in Danvers include Royal Governor General Thomas Gage and Benedict Arnold. Arnold Plaque is found at 1 Conant Street.

Danvers was the birthplace of Israel Putnam, one of the most colorful figures of the colonial period and American Revolution.  He built a successful farm, with fruit trees and flocks of sheep, and at one point crawled into a wolf's den on his hands and knees to kill a wolf that had been eating his sheep.  He went into the den's narrow passage with a torch in one hand, a musket in the other, and a rope tied to his feet leading to his friends outside so they could pull him out if things went wrong.  His one shot from the musket got the wolf.  He fought with Roger's Rangers in the French & Indian War. At one point the Indians captured him, had tied him to a tree, and were going to burn him alive.  A French officer rescued him in the nick of time.

When the first shots of the American Revolution were fired at the Battle of Lexington and Concord, word reached Putnam on his farm.  He literally "came off the plow" to ride off to war again.  Without bothering to change his clothes, he mounted his horse and rode the 25 miles to the scene in 18 hours.  He was known for his courage, and demonstrated it at the Battle of Bunker Hill, where he is credited with giving the command "Don't fire until you can see the whites of their eyes."  He became a major general in the Revolutionary War.  His birthplace in Danvers, known as the General Israel Putnam House, still stands.

19th century
In 1847, the railroad came to Danvers. A street railway was installed in 1884, originally consisting of 69 horse-drawn trolleys. This system was later converted to electricity.

The Town Hall was built in 1855. It has been modified and renovated and is still in use. Also in 1855, the southern portion of Danvers broke away to become the town of South Danvers, later renamed Peabody.

In 1878, the Danvers State Hospital opened its doors. This was an institution to provide asylum and treatment for the mentally ill.

Originally an agricultural town, Danvers farmers developed two breeds of vegetables: the Danvers Onion (origin of the "Oniontown" nickname) and the Danvers Half-Long Carrot. This carrot was introduced by "market gardeners" in 1871.

Shoe manufacturing was a prominent industry in the late 19th and early 20th centuries. Successful manufacturing companies included Ideal Baby Shoe. Local shoe companies were undercut in price by factories in other areas, and shoe manufacturing moved out.

Films
Movies filmed in Danvers, Massachusetts include:

 Hubie Halloween (2019)
 Ted 2 (2015)
 Crooked Arrows (2012)
 Session 9 (2001)
 Home Before Dark (1958)

Chemical plant explosion

On November 22, 2006, around 2:46 a.m., a major chemical explosion occurred at a facility housing Arnel Company (a manufacturer of industrial-use paint products) and CAI Inc. (a manufacturer of solvents and inks). The blast shook several North Shore towns, knocking homes off foundations and damaging buildings up to half a mile away.

No one was killed, and none of the injuries were life-threatening, according to Fire Chief Jim Tutko. Approximately 90 homes were damaged. Residents whose homes were damaged or destroyed in the blast were taken to Danvers High School, where the Red Cross established a relief shelter. The blast occurred next to a marina, a bakery/pizza shop, and a gas station, and across the street from Eastern Propane Gas.

A May 13, 2008 report from the U.S. Chemical Safety and Hazard Investigation Board attributed the explosion to unintentional overnight heating of an ink-mixing tank containing flammable solvents.

Geography
The tidal Danvers River begins near the southeast corner of town, and is formed by the confluence of the Porter River, Crane River and Waters River. These rivers, in turn, are fed by several brooks. The Ipswich River also flows along the town's western border. The Putnamville Reservoir lies in the north end of the town, which supplies drinking water to the towns of Salem and Beverly.

Though being at sea level in the Danversport area, the town has numerous hills reaching around 130 to 180 feet in elevation, including Dales Hill (located at St. John's Preparatory School), Ferncroft Hill, Folly Hill, Hathorne Hill, Lindall Hill, Nichols Hill, Putnam Hill, Rocky Hill and Whipple Hill (part of Endicott Park).

Danvers has numerous villages dating back the late 1800s when the town had a bustling railroad. These include Burley's Corner, Danvers Center, Danversport, Downtown, Ferncroft, Hathorne (which still has its own post office and ZIP code), Putnamville and Tapleyville.

Climate

In a typical year, Danvers, Massachusetts temperatures fall below 50F° for 184 days per year. Annual precipitation is typically 44.1 inches per year (high in the US). It may be helpful to understand the yearly precipitation by imagining 9 straight days of moderate rain per year. The humidity is below 60% for approximately 34.4 days or 9.4% of the year.

Transportation

It is bordered by Topsfield to the north, Wenham to the northeast, Beverly to the east, a small portion of Salem to the southeast, Peabody to the south and southwest, and Middleton to the northwest. Interstate 95 and Massachusetts Route 128 both pass through the town, just east of their junction in Peabody. U.S. Route 1 also passes through town, with a large junction with Interstate 95 in the northwest end of town. The main highways are also crossed by Route 35, Route 62 and Route 114, with Routes 35 and 62 intersecting just north of the town center. The northern terminus of Route 35 is just over the Topsfield town line, where it meets Route 97.

Several MBTA bus routes pass through the town, between Peabody and Beverly. There is no commuter rail service within town; the Newburyport/Rockport Line of the MBTA Commuter Rail passes through neighboring Salem and Beverly. Two lines of the Springfield Terminal railroad, running through Springfield, Massachusetts, also cross through town, merging near the town center to head north. Two runways of the Beverly Municipal Airport cross through the town; the nearest regularly scheduled commercial flights are located at Boston's Logan International Airport.

Demographics

As of the census of 2000, there were 25,212 people, 9,555 households, and 6,564 families residing in the town. The racial makeup of the town was 97.72% White, 0.35% Black or African American, 0.10% Native American, 1.11% Asian, 0.02% Pacific Islander, 0.22% from other races, and 0.48% from two or more races. Hispanic or Latino of any race were 0.83% of the population.

There were 9,555 households, out of which 30.9% had children under the age of 18 living with them, 56.2% were married couples living together, 9.4% had a female householder with no husband present, and 31.3% were non-families. 26.6% of all households were made up of individuals, and 10.8% had someone living alone who was 65 years of age or older. The average household size was 2.53 and the average family size was 3.11.

In the town, the population was spread out, with 23.2% under the age of 18, 6.4% from 18 to 24, 28.7% from 25 to 44, 24.5% from 45 to 64, and 17.2% who were 65 years of age or older. The median age was 40 years. For every 100 females, there were 86.9 males. For every 100 females age 18 and over, there were 84.2 males.

The median income for a household in the town was $58,779, and the median income for a family was $70,565. Males had a median income of $48,058 versus $33,825 for females. The per capita income for the town was $26,852. About 1.7% of families and 2.9% of the population were below the poverty line, including 3.0% of those under age 18 and 4.4% of those age 65 or over.

Government
Danvers has a Plan E form of government, which is a combination of a representative town meeting and town manager. It also has an elected board of selectmen.

Economy

Top employers
According to the town's 2018 Comprehensive Annual Financial Report, the top ten employers in the town are:

Danvers has seen major growth in the Food truck revolution: and this had led to some of the food truck owners moving toward more permanent cafes

Public safety

Danvers has full-time police and fire departments. Emergency medical services are provided by Atlantic Ambulance (a Division of Cataldo Ambulance), a large private ambulance company based in Somerville.  The Town was previously served by Lyons Ambulance Service, a small private ambulance company which had served the town since 1904 before being bought by Cataldo Ambulance in 2017. The Danvers Police Department was accredited in 1986. Danvers was the first municipal agency within the Commonwealth of Massachusetts to become nationally accredited.

1990 gas leaks and explosions

On April 2, 1990, the natural gas lines serving homes were accidentally over-pressurized by a Boston Gas worker, resulting in fires and explosions along Lafayette St., Maple St., Venice St. and Beaver Park Av. which injured six people.

Education

Public schools
The town of Danvers comprises its own school district, Danvers Public Schools. The district has five elementary schools (Highlands Elementary, Riverside Elementary, Great Oak Elementary, Thorpe Elementary, and Smith Elementary), each serving kindergarten through fifth grade (Riverside, Thorpe, and Great Oak also includes pre-kindergarten.) Grades six through eight attend the Holten-Richmond Middle School. Grades nine through twelve attend Danvers High School.

Danvers competes in Little League Baseball as part of two local leagues; the Danvers National Little League (DNLL) on the south and west side of town, and the Danvers American Little League (DALL) on the north and east side of town. Kids in the DNLL primarily go to Highlands and Great Oak Elementary Schools, while kids in DALL primarily go to Smith and Thorpe Elementary Schools. Riverside Elementary is split between the two.

Private schools
Danvers is home to three private schools. St. Mary of the Annunciation School serves pre-kindergarten through eighth grade. Plumfield Academy is a small school for grades one through eight, with a philosophy of education based on that of Charlotte Mason. St. John's Preparatory School is a school for young men, serving grades six through twelve. St. Mary's and St. John's are religiously affiliated. St. Mary's is part of the Archdiocese of Boston and Saint John's or commonly known as "the Prep" is a Xaverian Brothers-sponsored school.

Vocational schools
In addition to the public and private schools, Danvers once hosted Essex Agricultural High School, an independent, state-funded day school serving grades 9 through 12. Essex Agricultural High School has merged with North Shore Tech, which was located in Middleton, which has resulted in a larger, unified campus located in Danvers.

Essex North Shore Agricultural and Technical School opened in September 2014. The school offers 24 technical and agricultural programs to students from in-district towns, and offers the seven agricultural programs to out-of-district students.

Points of interest

 Danvers State Hospital
 Derby Summer House, on the grounds of the Glen Magna Farms
 Endicott Park
 Endicott Pear Tree, perhaps the oldest living fruit tree in North America
 Glen Magna Farms
 Judge Samuel Holten House
 Rebecca Nurse Homestead
 General Israel Putnam House
 Salem Village Historic District
 Ingersoll's Ordinary, former colonial tavern and site of many events during the Salem Village Witchcraft Delusion

Notable people

Athletes

 David Bavaro, NFL football athlete
 Mark Bavaro, NFL football athlete
 Maggie Connor, Olympian, skiing
 Meghan Duggan, Olympian, hockey
 Jenny Thompson, Olympian, swimming

Creative arts

 Brad Delp, lead singer of the band Boston
 Matt Farley, musician, creator of Motern Media
 Francis Sumner Merritt (1913–2000), painter, co-founder and first director of Haystack Mountain School of Crafts
 Nick Di Paolo, comedian, actor, podcaster

Writers
 Harriet Putnam Fowler (1842–1901), writer
 Eliza Putnam Heaton, journalist, writer, editor

Military
 Grenville M. Dodge
 Israel Putnam

Politicians and business

 Quan Barry, author, poet
 Samuel Holten, president of the Continental Congress
 John Marsh, early California pioneer and businessman
 Rebecca Nurse, executed as part of the Salem Witch Trials
 Samuel Parris, minister of the Salem Village Church during the Salem Witch Trials

See also

References

External links

 
 Town of Danvers official website
 Danvers Historical Society webpage – owner of the General Israel Putnam House
 

 
Towns in Essex County, Massachusetts
Towns in Massachusetts
Salem witch trials
Populated places established in 1636